Kojonup Reserve is a  nature reserve in south-west Western Australia. It is owned and managed by Bush Heritage Australia (BHA), by which it was purchased in 1996.

Flora and fauna
The reserve protects one of the few remaining remnants of wandoo woodland in the south-west of the state.  Mammals recorded from the reserve include the western grey kangaroo, common brushtail possum and western brush wallaby. Many woodland birds have been recorded, including scarlet, red-capped and western yellow robins, jacky winter and regent parrot.

References

External links
 Bush Heritage Australia

Bush Heritage Australia reserves
Nature reserves in Western Australia
1996 establishments in Australia